TASA – Transportes Aéreos Sul-Americanos was a Brazilian airline founded in 1948. It ceased operations in 1949. Founded by the Italian Ciro Lisita and partners of São Paulo.

History
TASA was founded in 1948 and flew between São Paulo and Goiânia with a single Douglas DC-3. TASA later bought two converted Douglas B-18 Bolo but never flew them. It ceased operations in 1949.

Destinations
TASA flew to the following cities:
Goiânia – Santa Genoveva Airport
São Paulo – Congonhas Airport

Fleet

See also

List of defunct airlines of Brazil

References

External links

Defunct airlines of Brazil
Airlines established in 1948
Airlines disestablished in 1949
1948 establishments in Brazil
1949 disestablishments in Brazil